Eric Mendelsohn (born November 1, 1964) is an American film director and screenwriter.

Biography
Two of his films have been screened in the Un Certain Regard section at Cannes: Through an Open Window in 1992 and Judy Berlin in 1999., which won the Directing Award at the 1999 Sundance Film Festival. His third film, 3 Backyards, also earned the Directing Award at the Sundance Film Festival in 2010, making him the only person in history to receive that honor twice.  Mendelsohn also co-wrote the screenplay of the 2017 film Love After Love with Russell Harbaugh.

He teaches at Columbia University's School of the Arts in New York City. Mendelsohn is one of five siblings. One of his brothers is author and critic Daniel Mendelsohn.

Filmography
 Through an Open Window (1993)
 Judy Berlin (1999)
 3 Backyards (2010)

References

External links

1964 births
Living people
American film directors
American male screenwriters
People from Old Bethpage, New York
Columbia University faculty
Screenwriters from New York (state)